Bonpara is a paurashava (municipal corporation) in Baraigram Upazila of Natore District in north-western Bangladesh.

History
Catholic Christian missionaries in the Bhawal region cleared the woods and founded human settlements in the late 1920s. Because of the abundance of woods, it is called Banpara. Initially, only Christians lived in this neighborhood, but other faiths eventually moved in. At the moment, all faiths may be found here.
Banpara was incorporated as a municipality on December 31, 2000.

Baraigram Upazila Chairman Murder 
Sanaullah Noor Babu, the chairman of Baraigram upazila, was murdered on October 8, 2010.

Sunil Gomes murder
On Oct. 5, Sunil Gomes was killed at his grocery store.

Photo gallery

References

Villages in Natore District
Villages in Rajshahi Division